The Cuban Grand Prix, also known as the Havana Grand Prix, was a sports car motor race held for a brief period in the late 1950s in Havana, Cuba, last raced in 1960. The 1958 race is best remembered as the backdrop to the kidnapping of Formula One World Champion driver Juan Manuel Fangio by anti-government rebels linked to the 26th of July Movement. There is an exclusive report in the newspaper Zig Zag by the man who allegedly kidnapped Fangio and a note by Fangio.

The race was established in 1957 as Fulgencio Batista envisioned creating an event to attract tourists, particularly from the United States. A street circuit was established on the Malecón. The first race was a success; it was won by Fangio driving a Maserati 300S, leading home Carroll Shelby driving a Ferrari 410 S and Alfonso de Portago in a Ferrari 860 Monza.

The following year the official Maserati team arrived in force with their fleet of Maserati 300S cars and Fangio and Stirling Moss as drivers. On the eve of the race Fangio was abducted from his hotel by an armed man. The Cuban government ordered the race to continue. Moss and Masten Gregory led the race which was red flagged after just six laps. Armando Garcia Cifuentes had crashed his Ferrari into the crowd, killing seven.

The 1959 race was cancelled as Fidel Castro's revolution entered its final stages. The race returned in 1960, at a new venue on service roads around a military airfield. Moss, driving a Maserati Birdcage for privateer team Camoradi, had a comfortable victory over NART run Ferrari 250 TR59 driven by Pedro Rodríguez with Masten Gregory third in a Porsche 718.

Winners of the Cuban Grand Prix

Gallery

See also

Barrio de San Lázaro, Havana
Hospital de San Lázaro, Havana
Monument to the Victims of the USS Maine (Havana)
La Casa de Beneficencia y Maternidad de La Habana

References

External links

 Cuban Grand Prix - 1958
 Disaster At Cuban Grand Prix After Fangio Kidnapping (1958)
 Gran Premio de Cuba - 1957 
 Gran Premio de Cuba, 1958

Sports car races
National Grands Prix
Grand Prix
Recurring sporting events established in 1957
Recurring sporting events disestablished in 1960
Auto racing controversies